The Solicitors Qualifying Examination (SQE) is the main process of qualifying as a solicitor in England and Wales. The requirements comprise tertiary education (level 6, not necessarily a degree) in any subject, passing two SQE assessments, work experience for two years full-time (or part-time equivalent), meeting the Solicitors Regulation Authority (SRA)'s requirements for character and suitability.

History 
The Legal Services Board approved the SQE route on 28 October 2020, after nine years of consultation on solicitors' training. It came into effect in Autumn 2021, with anyone starting to qualify as a solicitor in 2022 onwards having to take the SQE route. A 10-year transition period to 2031 will allow the completion of qualifications commenced under the previous regime.

Previous routes 
There were previously four routes to qualifying as a solicitor in England and Wales: for candidates with a law degree (Legal Practice Course), for those with a different degree (Common Professional Examination), for those qualifying in a different country (Qualified Lawyers Transfer Scheme), and for qualified legal executives. The process is now simpler: any candidate with any background must undertake the SQE.

Subject Tested

SQE 1

Functioning Legal Knowledge (FLK) 1 
 Ethics
 Contract Law
 Legal System: The English Legal System and retained EU Law, Public Law(Constitutional Law and Administrative Law), Human Rights
 Legal Services: Financial Services
 Business Law and Practice: This includes Business Taxation
 Tort Law
 Dispute Resolution

FLK 2
 Ethics: Solicitors' Accounts
 Criminal Liability
 Land Law
 Trust Law: Equity and Trusts
 Wills & Intestacy: Wills and Administration of Estates
 Property Practice
 Criminal Law & Practice

SQE2

Oral
The client interviewing skills and completion of an attendance note and advocacy skills are tested through four oral exams that take place over two half days. 
 Day 1: Advocacy (Dispute Resolution); Interview and attendance note/legal analysis (Property Practice)
 Day 2: Interview and attendance note/legal analysis (Wills and Intestacy, Probate Administration and Practice)

Written
Legal research, legal writing, legal drafting and case and matter analysis are tested in the five areas of law taking place over three half days.

References

English law
Welsh law
Legal profession exams